Dathan is a surname. Notable people with the surname include:

Johann Georg Dathan (1701–1749), German painter 
Lucy Dathan, American politician